Arland may refer to:

People
Arland (name)

Games
 Atelier Rorona: The Alchemist of Arland
 Atelier Totori: Alchemist of Arland 2
 Atelier Meruru: The Alchemist of Arland 3

Places
Norway
 Årland, a village
United States
 Arland, Wisconsin, a town
 Arland (community), Wisconsin, an unincorporated community

See also
Aurland
Ayreland (disambiguation)
Harland (disambiguation)
Hærland
Waarland